Ban Muang can refer to:

Ban Mueang, King of Sukhothai
Ban Muang District in Sakon Nakhon Province, Thailand
Ban Muang (newspaper), a daily newspaper in Thai
Ban Muang, the name of hundreds of localities in Thailand, including:
Ban Muang, a tambon of Ban Pong District, Ratchaburi Province, Thailand